"Somebody's Watching Me" is a song recorded by American singer Rockwell, released by the Motown label in 1984, as the lead single from his debut studio album of the same name. It features guest vocals by brothers Michael Jackson (in the chorus) and Jermaine Jackson (additional backing vocals). The song became a major commercial success internationally, topping the charts in Belgium, France, and Spain, and reaching the top 5 in Canada, West Germany, the Netherlands, New Zealand, South Africa, Sweden, Switzerland, and the United States. In the UK, it reached No. 6 and is Rockwell's only top 40 hit on the UK Singles Chart.

Background and composition
Rockwell is a son of Motown CEO Berry Gordy. At the time of the recording, Rockwell was estranged from his father and living with Ray Singleton, his father's ex-wife and the mother of his older half-brother, Kerry Gordy. Singleton served as executive producer on the project and would occasionally play some demo tracks to Berry. The elder Gordy was less than enthusiastic about Rockwell's music until he heard the single with Michael Jackson's familiar voice featuring prominently on background vocals.

"Somebody's Watching Me" was written in the key of C minor, though the final recording is a quarter tone sharp. The song is in  time with a tempo of 124 beats per minute. The vocals span from C4 to C5.

Produced by Curtis Anthony Nolen, the song featured backing vocals by Michael and Jermaine Jackson, with Alan Murray on percussion.

Charts

Weekly charts

Year-end charts

Certifications

DJ BoBo version: "Somebody Dance with Me"

DJ BoBo based his 1992 single "Somebody Dance with Me" on "Somebody's Watching Me" with new lyrics and rap. The DJ BoBo single reached No. 1 in Sweden and Switzerland, and the Top 5 in Austria, Finland, Germany, the Netherlands and Norway. In 2012, a remix of the hit was made by Remady titled "Somebody Dance With Me (Remady 2013 Mix)" by DJ BoBo featuring Manu-L. Released early in 2013, it charted on the Swiss Hitparade, reaching No. 4. The mix was made on the 20th anniversary of the initial hit by DJ BoBo in November 1992.

Beatfreakz version

In 2006, Dutch dance group Beatfreakz recorded a pseudo-cover of the song that samples the chorus but omitted the verses. This version was a top-10 hit in Belgium, Finland, Ireland, New Zealand, and the United Kingdom.

Track listing
Dutch CD single
"Somebody's Watching Me" (Hi_Tack radio edit)
"Somebody's Watching Me" (Hi_Tack remix)
"Somebody's Watching Me" (Dennis Christopher remix)
"Somebody's Watching Me" (E-Craigs 2006 mix)
"Somebody's Watching Me" (BeatFreakz Clubmix)
"Somebody's Watching Me" (Ian Carey club mix)

Charts

Weekly charts

Year-end charts

Certifications

Release history

See also
List of number-one R&B singles of 1984 (U.S.)
Billboard Year-End Hot 100 singles of 1984
List of number-one singles of 1984 (France)
List of number-one singles of 1984 (Spain)

References

1983 songs
1984 debut singles
2006 debut singles
Data Records singles
Ministry of Sound singles
Motown singles
Number-one singles in France
Number-one singles in Spain
Rockwell (musician) songs
Songs written by Rockwell (musician)
Spinnin' Records singles
Ultratop 50 Singles (Flanders) number-one singles
Halloween songs